Escuela de Bellas Artes may refer to:

 Escuela de Bellas Artes de Ponce, Ponce, Puerto Rico
Escuela de Bellas Artes, La Paz, Bolivia
 Escuela de Bellas Artes de Quito, in Quito, Ecuador
 Escuela de Bellas Artes San Alejandro, in Marianao, Havana
 Escuela de Bellas Artes de San Fernando, in Madrid

See also
Escuela Nacional de Bellas Artes (disambiguation)